Bridge the World is the Japanese debut studio album of South Korean boy band NU'EST and their second studio album overall. The album was released on November 18, 2015.

Background and release
Bridge the World is the Japanese debut studio album of NU'EST. The album was released under Ariola Japan on November 18, 2015. The album was released in three versions: a regular edition and two limited editions with bonus tracks and exclusive DVDs.

Composition

The album was described as having many "bright and fun" songs. "Cherry" is the theme song of the film Their Distance, which all the members starred in.

"Koisuru Hi" is Minhyun's solo song released on the limited edition B version of the album. Katsuhiko Yamamoto, who had previously written songs for TVXQ's Japanese albums, had written the song while picturing him.

Reception

The album debuted at #7 in the Oricon Weekly Albums Chart and charted for 2 weeks, selling 22,754 physical copies. In South Korea, the album sold 1,655 copies.

Track listing

Charts

References

2015 albums
NU'EST albums
Hybe Corporation albums